Antonio Arias may refer to:
Antonio Arias (mayor), mayor of Ponce, Puerto Rico in 1903
Antonio Arias (footballer) (born 1944), Chilean football player
 Antonio Fernandez Arias (died 1684), Spanish painter of the Baroque period
Antonio Arias Arias, Spanish Republican Air Force pilot and air ace 
 Antonio Arias (referee) (born 1972), Paraguayan football referee